Bosara maculilinea is a moth in the family Geometridae. It is found in Papua New Guinea (Key islands).

References

Moths described in 1898
Eupitheciini
Moths of Papua New Guinea